Soilent Green is an American extreme metal band formed in 1988 in Chalmette/Metairie on the suburbs of New Orleans, Louisiana. Described as a sludge metal and grindcore band, the group blends elements of death metal, black metal, hardcore, and bluesy, groove-oriented Southern rock.

Overview
Soilent Green was founded in 1988, but their debut album was not released until 1995, when Pussysoul came out via Dwell Records. The following four albums were released by Relapse Records, until they signed with Metal Blade Records for their 2008 album, Inevitable Collapse in the Presence of Conviction.

Deaths
On April 26, 2004, bassist Scott Williams was killed in a murder–suicide by his partner.

In September 2005, former singer Glenn Rambo was killed in Hurricane Katrina.

In popular culture
In 2009, they were featured on the first episode of season four on the Adult Swim show Squidbillies, episode 41, entitled "Lerm". They performed the main title theme in a cowpunk/sludge style.

Members

Current
Tommy Buckley – drums (1988–present)
Brian Patton – guitars (1988–present)
Ben Falgoust – vocals (1993–present)
Scott Crochet – bass (2003–present)

Former
Donovan Punch – rhythm guitar (1988–1999)
Glenn Rambo – vocals (1988–1992; died 2005)
Marcel Trenchard - bass (1988–1992)
Scott Williams – bass (1992–2002; died 2004)
Ben Stout – rhythm guitar (2000–2001)
Tony White – rhythm guitar (2003–2005)
Gregg Harney – rhythm guitar (2005–2007)

Timeline

Discography

References

External links

Heavy metal musical groups from Louisiana
Musical groups from New Orleans
American sludge metal musical groups
American grindcore musical groups
Relapse Records artists
Musical groups established in 1988
Musical quartets